Belarus has participated twice in the Eurovision Young Musicians since its debut in 2010, most recently taking part in 2012.

Participation overview

See also
Belarus in the Eurovision Song Contest
Belarus in the Junior Eurovision Song Contest
Belarus in the Türkvizyon Song Contest

References

External links
 Eurovision Young Musicians

Countries in the Eurovision Young Musicians